Capizzi (Latin: Capitium) is a comune (municipality) in the Metropolitan City of Messina in the Italian region Sicily, located about  southeast of Palermo and about  southwest of Messina.

Capizzi borders the following municipalities: Caronia, Cerami, Cesarò, Mistretta.

History
The origins of Capizzi are unclear, although certainly ancient. Capitium is mentioned by Cicero and Ptolemy, and appears from the former to have been a place of some importance. He mentions it in conjunction with Haluntium (modern San Marco d'Alunzio), Enguium (modern Gangi), and other towns in the northern part of the island, and Ptolemy enumerates it among the inland cities of Sicily.

References

Roman towns and cities in Italy
Ancient cities in Sicily